Cindy Nelson is a Brisbane-based actor best known for playing the lead role in the 2010 film Jucy, which was partly based on the real-life friendship between herself and co-star Francesca Gasteen. The film had its world premiere at the Toronto International Film Festival.

Filmography
All My Friends Are Leaving Brisbane (2007)
Jucy (2011)

References

External links

Australian film actresses
Living people
Year of birth missing (living people)